The 1984 SMU Mustangs football team represented Southern Methodist University (SMU) as a member of the Southwest Conference (SWC) during the 1984 NCAA Division I-A football season. Led by third-year head coach Bobby Collins, the Mustangs compiled an overall record 10–2 with a mark of 6–2 in conference play, sharing the SWC title with Houston and marking the third time in four years that SMU had at least a share of the title. 

While Houston, who beat SMU, received a bid to the Cotton Bowl Classic, the Mustangs were invited to play in the Aloha Bowl, where they defeated Notre Dame, 27–20. SMU finished the season ranked No. 8 in both the major polls.

1984 marked SMU's fourth consecutive ten-win season. The Mustangs did not make another bowl game appearance until the 2009 season.

Schedule

Roster

Team players in the NFL

References

SMU
SMU Mustangs football seasons
Southwest Conference football champion seasons
Aloha Bowl champion seasons
SMU Mustangs football